The "Revival Process" or the "Process of Rebirth" refers to a policy of forced assimilation practiced by the socialist Bulgarian government in the 1980s (1984-1989). It was the culmination of a series of repressive assimilationist campaigns directed at the country's Muslim minority. The "Revival Process" was in turn followed by the forced expulsion of over 300,000 Muslims in 1989.

Terminology
"Revival Process" - Like with the "Big Excursion", the name "Revival Process", under which this campaign of forced assimilation is most well known, is euphemistic and ambiguous. It likewise originated from the statements and official correspondence of the socialist Bulgarian government while it carried out the policy, and its use is disliked by many of its victims. With regard for the contentious nature of the term, "Revival Process" is presented in quotations in this article.

Turk/Muslim - While Muslims of all ethnicities (Turks, Pomaks, Muslim Roma, Albanians and Tatars among others) were affected by the "Revival Process", most Muslim Bulgarian nationals were referred to as "Turks" by the Bulgarian government whether ethnically Turkish or not. Further complicating the matter, some Bulgarian Muslims whose native language was not Turkish themselves identified as ethnically "Turkish", or at least did not strongly contest the label. Indeed, as a result of the prevalence of Turkish-medium schools for Muslims in Bulgaria prior to the 1972 ban and the leading position of the Turkish ethnic minority among Bulgarian Muslims, many of the country's Muslims from non-Turkish ethnic backgrounds spoke the Turkish language in their daily lives. Thus, the term "Turk" is placed in quotations in this article when referring to the wider Muslim community who did not necessarily identify as Turkish.

Background

Demographic Situation

In the 6th and 7th centuries CE, waves of Slavic migrants settled in what is now Bulgaria, leading to the total Slavicization of the area. In the late 7th century, the area, previously under the control of the Eastern Roman Empire, was conquered by the pagan Turkic (not Turkish) Bulgars, becoming the center of the powerful First Bulgarian Empire.

Subsequently, the Bulgar ruling class gradually assimilated into the culture of the local Slavic inhabitants of the area, and Bulgaria embraced Byzantine-rite Christianity. Bulgaria would remain officially Christian from the conversion of Boris I in 864 until the Ottoman Turkish (Muslim) conquest of Bulgaria completed in 1396.

The Orthodox Christian Slavic Bulgarians rallied around their faith under Ottoman rule and Christianity became increasingly central to Bulgarian ethnic identity. While some Bulgarian Slavs converted to Islam (though many retained their Slavic language and customs) during the nearly five centuries of Ottoman rule, the vast majority kept their Christian faith. Large numbers of Turks also settled in Bulgaria during the Ottoman period and some Slavic converts to Islam embraced a Turkish identity.

When Bulgaria at last regained independence at the end of the 19th century, the new nation found itself with a large Muslim minority population. Though many Muslims left Bulgaria following the successive Balkan Wars and the First World War, a large number remained.

The Communist Era

From independence, Bulgaria was a monarchy. In 1941, Nazi Germany demanded that Bulgaria sign the Tripartite Pact and permit the transit of Axis powers troops through its territory. Bulgaria acquiesced, and despite widespread Russophilia, it thus sided with the Axis powers in the Second World War and was defeated in turn by the Soviet Union.

Under de-facto military occupation by Soviet troops, in September 1946, the monarchy was abolished by plebiscite, which resulted in 95.6 percent voting in favor of a republic. The country was thereafter re-organized on the model of the Stalinist Soviet Union. Religious organizations and non-Communist political organizations were suppressed, and political repression increased.

In 1954, Todor Zhivkov became general secretary of the ruling Bulgarian Communist Party and thus de-facto ruler of the country. Under Zhivkov, Bulgaria became a bastion of Stalinism in the Warsaw Pact. As other European nations in the Soviet sphere grappled with widespread discontent and occasionally turned to reformism, Zhivkov's Bulgaria remained steadfast in its commitment to Moscow and authoritarian State Socialism.

In 1971, the rule of Comrade Zhivkov was further strengthened under Article 1 of the new constitution, which enshrined the PA as the "leading force of society and the state". Zhivkov was formally promoted to Head of State (Chairman of the State Council) and Stanko Todorov became Prime Minister. Zhivkov's rule would continue for the next eighteen years.

According to the 1975 Blulgarian census, the last taken before the start of the "Revival Process" which recorded ethnicity, "Turks" made up around 8.4% of the Bulgarian population of 8.7 Million. This was down from the final census taken before the start of the Communist era in 1946 where "Turks" comprised 9.6% of the population. The Muslim population was concentrated primarily in the country's northeast and southeast (particularly Kardzhali Province).

Though the People's Republic of Bulgaria officially practiced State Atheism, in line with Marxist-Leninist doctrine, and that since the 1940s and religious expression had been tightly controlled, the state viewed domestic Muslims, whether practicing or not, as the Bulgarian victims of Ottoman religious and cultural assimilation - wayward Bulgarians. Though the regime had long encouraged assimilationism to some degree, as the Eastern Bloc wavered in the 1980s, the Zhivkov regime leaned more heavily into Bulgarian ethno-nationalism to prop itself up and stepped up repression of the Muslim population in particular.

For instance, while the Politburo of the Bulgarian Communist Party’s Central Committee first proposed Bulgarianisation measures in 1962, even in 1964, Zhivkov seemingly defended the continued use of the Turkish language in Bugaria when he congratulated the Turkish-language monthly Yeni Hayat. He wrote: "Now and in the future the Turkish population will speak their mother tongue; they will develop their progressive traditions in this language; they will write their contemporary literary works [in Turkish]; they will sing their wonderfully beautiful songs [in Turkish]." In 1971, however, the term "national minorities" was removed from the constitution and replaced with the term "nationals of non-Bulgarian origin", and in 1986 the concept of a unitary (homogenous) Bulgaria was also constitutionally enshrined.

Interestingly, the name-changing effort carried out by the Bulgarian Communist Party was not without precedent in the Eastern Bloc. In the late 1940s, the government of the recently-established Polish People's Republic forced over one million so-called "Autochthons" (Kashubians, Masurians, and Silesians) to Polonize their Germanic-sounding names. Poland viewed these people groups similarly to how Bulgaria viewed its Muslims - as wayward culturally and religiously converted Bulgarians. Poland was able to successfully "distance" these (typically bilingual) people from Germany to support its assimilation efforts. Though it is not known where the Bulgarians were aware of the earlier campaign in socialist Poland, the similarities between the Polish effort and the later Bulgarian efforts are apparent.

Forced Assimilation

Initial Campaigns
The policy of the Bulgarian Communist Party towards ethnic and religious minorities evolved during the forty year course of one-party rule. The draconian policies that characterized the Revival Process were not the first such efforts on the part of the Bulgarian People's Republic.

Following its defeat in World War Two, the Soviet Union forced Bulgaria to recognize various ethnic minority groups, including Macedonians (a Slavic group who are today viewed in Bulgaria as merely a regional sub-group of Bulgarians). As a result, the 1946 Bulgarian census gathered data on the number of residents identifying with various ethnic minority categories. With each successive official census, however, one or more ethnic minority groups were removed. For the 1965 census, owing to the rift between Josip Broz Tito's Yugoslavia (which controlled much of the region of Macedonia at the time) and the USSR, Bulgaria was allowed to cease recognizing Macedonians as a minority category. In 1975, Roma (gypsies) were removed as a category and the ethnic breakdown of the population was declared a state secret. For the 1985 census, information on ethnicity was no longer collected as "'there was no further need for it.'"

Until Zhivkov's removal from power, the Bulgarian regime denied the existence of any Muslims of non-Bulgarian origin and insisted that the Muslim population were descended from Bulgarians who had been forcibly converted to Islam under Ottoman Rule. In line with this view, education policy was also gradually made more assimilationist. In 1962, Pomaks were banned from attending Turkish-language schools, and in 1972, Turkish-language schools were banned altogether.

Following on from the ban on the Turkish language in schools, the government forced many Slavophone Muslims to Bulgarianize their names in the early 1970s. By 1974, 150,000 "Pomaks" and 200,000 "Turks" had been forced to Bulgarianize their names.

In 1978, the regime attempted to phase out traditional and religious holidays and observances in favor of approved socialist observances and rites. Officials were sent to Islamic funerals to ensure that the proper Socialist rites were carried out and prayers said in the Bulgarian language.

Just before the start of the Revival Process proper, the regime initiated a new round of limited forced Bulgarianization. Between 1981 and 1983, around 100,000 people, mainly Muslim Roma were forcibly Bulgarianized. The measure was extended to a number of Crimean Tatars and Alians (a Shia group, also referred to as Alevi or Kizilbash) mere months before the "Revival Process" began in earnest in 1984.

Start of the "Revival Process"
While many Muslims had thus already been forced to Bulgarianize their names, in 1984 the regime in Sofia decided to take the name-changing process to its conclusion. All ethnic Turks were to assimilate by changing their Turkish names. Turks were made to chose from a pre-approved list of "'real'" Bulgarian names in lieu of their original "Islamo-Arabic" names. Initially, only Turks living or born in the Rhodopes region in the country'southeast were required to change their names, but the requirement was ordered expanded to "all districts where there is such [a Turkish] population" in December of 1984, which was carried out a month later in January of 1985. By March 1985 the Bulgarian Government announced that "Bulgarisation" had been completed, and the Bulgarian Turks were provided with several newly issued documents for identification.

The creation of an ideologically coherent list of approved "Bulgarian" names proved to be a challenge for the authorities. While many had been made to change their names previously, the regime sought to develop a comprehensive "'Classifier of Bulgarian Names'" only in 1984. In the face of difficulties regarding the acceptability of foreign names (given names and surnames of Turkish, Arabic, Armenian, or some other non-Bulgarian origin) and the association between both foreign and "Bulgarian" and religion, the decision was eventually made to draft a list of 5,000 purely "Bulgarian" names, including those with a relationship to the Orthodox Christian calendar. Acceptable "Bulgarian" names were not just those of Slavic or Christian origin however, non-Islamic foreign names were also sometimes deemed acceptable. While this list was non completed prior to the start of the "Revival Process", some name indexes were available by that time.

The methods employed by the state to coerce Turkish villages to agree to "Bulgarisation" were particularly violent. According to one eyewitness account by an ethnic Bulgarian: "The [Turkish] village was surrounded by militia and/or special internal troops or regular army trucks or even light tanks. The village thus isolated, the mayor, the Communist Party secretary, and a few officials were then summoned and asked to sign a declaration that the village(rs) be given Bulgarian names... They were handed lists of Bulgarian names and then usually allowed twenty-four hours to consider. Most of these men agreed to cooperate and were thus held up as models for the rest of the village... Those who refused to comply, however, were taken by the militia from their homes... Eventually they signed. Those who still refused were held in a cellar for several days, abused, threatened, and beaten. If they still persisted, then imprisonment ensued."

Beyond the Bulgarianization of the names of living Muslims, Bulgarian authorities began to enforce other assimilation measures during the "Revival Process". During that time, Muslims were not allowed to bury their dead in Islamic cemeteries and were made to deface the Islamic or Arabic inscriptions and symbols on their ancestors graves. Store and restaurant owners were also prohibited from serving women in traditional Islamic dress. The pre-existing ban on Islamic circumcision was strictly enforced, and Muslim parents were required to sign documents promising not to circumcise their child. Officials regularly inspected Muslim boys to ensure they remained uncircumsized, and if a couple were found to have violated the ban, both the parents and the individual who had performed the circumcision faced punishment. These restrictions on Muslims remained in effect for the rest of the 1980s, with the Bulgarian government only promising to restore the rights of its Muslim population in December of 1989.

Reaction and Resistance
Similar to the system of government-controlled religious organizations which exists in the People's Republic of China today, Bulgaria tightly regulated the practice of Islam in the country. The People's Republic of Bulgaria formally employed a loyal Chief (Grand) Mufti along with regional Muftis throughout its reign. Unsurprisingly, the state-employed Chief Mufti expressed his support for the "Revival Process", declaring that "...There have been no cases of preventing or in any way restricting Muslims from performing religious rites and services."

Resistance to the "Revival Process" among the Turkish population itself, however, was strong. Given that even among the states of the Eastern Bloc, governmental opposition to the Communist regime was particularly weak in Bulgaria, Turks opposed to the "Revival Process" were forced to construct new organizations from scratch, and acts of resistance were thus often merely individual. For example, in spite of regulations, many continued to secretly practice their faith and instruct their children in the Turkish language and Islamic religion. Once the necessary structures had been established and organized opposition began in earnest (after the nominal conclusion of the campaign), opposition became increasingly visible. Turks and Muslims organized large-scale protests demanding the restoration of their rights and original names.

Rather than fight, however, many Turks initially attempted to escape the renaming process. While the international borders of the People's Republic of Bulgaria were generally closed, Turks sought refuge within the country. Many fled into the forests and other inaccessible areas to hide from the state while others attempted to flee for the big cities (where the re-naming process was slower and more cumbersome). Regardless, such escape attempts generally failed.

Muslims who refused to assimilate faced imprisonment, expulsion, or internment in the reactivated Belene labor camp, situated on an island in the Danube river. Some who were sent to Belene died, and many protesters were even directly killed in clashes with authorities. While the number of civilian causalities is not definitely known, according to Turkish sources, anywhere from 800 to 2,500 died between November 1984 and February 1985. Other observers, meanwhile, estimate the number of casualties at more than 1,000, though that number is likely to rise considerably when including the number of people who died of neglect or suicide in Belene.

In spite of the high number of fatalities among the Muslim community, organized armed resistance to the "Revival Process" never arose. Explanations for why resistance remained non-violent are varied (in contrast to contemporaneous armed movements in places like Northern Ireland). Rumen Avramov, who was an economic advisor to Bulgaria's first non-communist president, Zhelyu Zhelev, claims that the extreme level of repression carried out by the People's Republic of Bulgaria prevented the development of armed opposition.

Over 600 unorganized acts of "terror" were officially recorded by Sofia during the 1980s, with the regime blaming Turks and Muslims for the acts, as well as their opposition groups (such as the Turkish National Liberation Movement in Bulgaria which formally eschewed violence). Of those alleged 600 attacks, the vast majority cannot be explained conclusively. Of the 600, the only attack in which people undoubtedly lost their lives occurred in the village of Bunovo on March 9, 1985 wherein 6 people died.

It is possible that some of the attacks were carried out or entirely fabricated by the Bulgarian regime in order to drum up support from the non-Muslim population. For example, upon the opening of secret police archives after the fall of the Communist regime, it was discovered that the perpetrators of two high-profile attacks allegedly committed by Turks in 1984, one at the Varna airport and another at the Plovidv rail station, were agents of the secret police.

As a result of Muslim resistance to Bulgarianization and the "Revival Process", the government concluded that a subset of the Muslim population was intractable and could not be assimilated. The emigration of this subset was thus to be encouraged actively.

1989 ethnic cleansing

Muslim Protests
Emboldened by instability in the communist Eastern Bloc, in early 1989, Turks and Muslims took to the streets of Bulgaria in a wave of protests that ultimately totaled around 60,000 participants. The regime responded by arresting many, ultimately deporting more than 1,000 "'ringleaders'" to Austria and Yugoslavia.

The "Big Excursion"
In response to the protests of early 1989, Chairman of the Bulgarian state council, Todor Zhivkov, addressed the people of Bulgaria. In his address, he encouraged Bulgarian Turks to resettle in Turkey. Shortly thereafter, on 29 May 1989, the border with Turkey was opened exclusively for the country's Turks and Muslims. Over 300,000 left Communist Bulgaria for Turkey between 30 May 1989 and 22 August 1989 in a process referred to by the communist Bulgarian government as the “Big Excursion”.

While the government of Bulgaria maintained that the migration of Muslims to Turkey was voluntary (thousands from the Eastern Bloc had risked their lives to seek refuge abroad, particularly in the late 1980s), many Bulgarian Turks had been coerced into leaving the country. By the time the border with Turkey was opened, state security services had already identified and earmarked individuals for expulsion.

Turkey eventually closed the border with Bulgaria to prevent the further immigration of Bulgarian Turks, and faced with difficulties settling in Turkey, within the first three months of their arrival in Turkey, 40,000 émigrés returned to Bulgaria. This process of return continued, and by the end of 1990, about 150,000 people had gone back to Bulgaria, which some allege suggests voluntary migration rather than ethnic cleansing.

Aftermath

Domestic
On 10 November 1989, Todor Zhivkov was forced to resign, and the new Bulgarian government restored the right of Bulgarian citizens to have Turkish names. Not all who had been forced to change their names, however, restored their original names. Today, many Bulgarians of legacy (non-immigrant background) Muslim origin born during or after the "Revival Process" bear Bulgarian names, and as part of the collective trauma from the event, some are left to wonder what their name would have otherwise been.

On 11 January 2012, the Bulgarian Parliament officially recognized the 1989 expulsion as ethnic cleansing, and while some Bulgarian mainstream parties have been rebuked for their continued neglect and disregard for the events of 1989, the events of that year are widely condemned. While the same declaration also condemned the wider campaign of forced assimilation, the domestic legacy of those campaigns and the "Revival Process" are more contentious.

In November 2002, the Bulgarian Orthodox Church declared all victims, including non-Christian victims, of the Bulgarian communist regime to be martyrs.

International
The international response to the revival process was minimal at the time. While some nations weakly protested the 1989 ethnic cleansing in particular, the broader "Revival Process" was soon largely forgotten. At a 2000 speech at Duquesne University in Pittsburgh, Pennsylvania, for example, keynote speaker and head of the National Security Agency Michael V. Hayden, made only non-specific reference to the "Revival Process" that he observed while stationed in Sofia during the Cold War because the audience would not have understood the "facts and context necessary to follow his talk."

When it was remembered, the Revival Process is usually associated with the government of Todor Zhivkov and the Bulgarian People's Republic.

In Turkey, memory of the "Revival Process" is limited and testimony by victims is limited.

Throughout the "Revival Process", many Bulgarian Turks also refuge abroad, not only in Turkey, but also in Western Europe, especially in Austria, Germany, and Sweden. Many also found refuge in Australia, Canada, England, and the United States. Today, diaspora communities originating from these Bulgarian Muslim asylees remain.

Responsibility
One 2012 study found that Bulgarians generally blame the politicians of the time for the "Revival Process". When asked who bore the blame for the campaign, respondents blamed the Bulgarian Communist Party, Todor Zhivkov, and the Secret Police. Some respondent even blamed the Soviet Union and Leonid Brezhnev (who died in 1982). The same study also found that victims do not generally blame ethnic-Bulgarians and are inclined to forgive them, with much blame instead heaped on fellow-Muslim "traitors" who collaborated with the regime.

In Popular Culture
Naim Süleymanoğlu (Bulgarian: Наим Сюлейманоглу) was an ethnically-Turkish Olympic weightlifter born in Bulgaria in 1967 as Naim Suleimanov (Bulgarian: Наим Сюлейманов). He was forced by the "Revival Process" to officially Bulgarianize his name and became known as "Naum Shalamanov" (Bulgarian: Наум Шаламанов) in 1985. The following year (1986), he defected to Turkey and began to compete for his new country in international weightlifting competitions. Following his defection he changed his name once again, this time to the name under which he is known internationally: the unabashedly Turkish "Naim Süleymanoğlu". Following his defection, he won the gold medal in his weight class in three consecutive Summer Olympic Games.

See also
Bulgarian Muslims
Bulgarian Turks
Bulgarian Turks in Turkey
Crimean Tatars in Bulgaria
Muhacir
Pomaks
Romani people in Bulgaria
Turks in Bulgaria
Turkish National Liberation Movement in Bulgaria

References

Bibliography

External links
 The Declaration Condemning the Attempted Forced Assimilation of Bulgarian Muslims (2012)

Post–World War II forced migrations
People's Republic of Bulgaria
Turkish diaspora in Europe
Ethnic cleansing in Europe
Bulgaria–Turkey relations
1980s in Bulgaria
Islam in Bulgaria
Pomaks
Persecution of Balkan Turks